Keith Barry Edwards (born 10 June 1944) is an English footballer, who played as a centre forward in the Football League for Chester.

References

1944 births
Living people
Association football forwards
Chester City F.C. players
English Football League players
People from Chester
English footballers